
Gmina Łącko is a rural gmina (administrative district) in Nowy Sącz County, Lesser Poland Voivodeship, in southern Poland. It roughly corresponds to the White Goral region. 

Villages
Gmina Łącko contains the villages and settlements of Brzyna, Czarny Potok, Czerniec, Jazowsko, Kadcza, Kicznia, Łącko, Łazy Brzyńskie, Maszkowice, Obidza, Szczereż, Wola Kosnowa, Wola Piskulina, Zabrzeż, Zagorzyn and Zarzecze.

Neighbouring gminas
Gmina Łącko is bordered by the town of Szczawnica and by the gminas of Kamienica, Krościenko nad Dunajcem, Łukowica, Ochotnica Dolna, Podegrodzie and Stary Sącz.

References
Polish official population figures 2006

Lacko
Nowy Sącz County